Melrose Township may refer to the following places in the United States:

 Melrose Township, Adams County, Illinois
 Melrose Township, Clark County, Illinois
 Melrose Township, Grundy County, Iowa
 Melrose Township, Michigan
 Melrose Township, Stearns County, Minnesota
 Melrose Township, Steele County, North Dakota, in Steele County, North Dakota
 Melrose Township, Grant County, South Dakota, in Grant County, South Dakota

Township name disambiguation pages